Pyrausta niveicilialis, the white-fringed pyrausta moth, is a moth in the family Crambidae. It was described by Augustus Radcliffe Grote in 1875. It is found in North America, where it has been recorded from southern Canada to Florida and west to Colorado.

The wingspan is about 24 mm. The forewings are dusty blackish, with a yellowish shade in the costal region. Adults are on wing from March to October.

References

Moths described in 1875
niveicilialis
Moths of North America